The Page-Walker Hotel, also known as  the Page-Walker Arts & History Center, is a historic house museum and former hotel located in Cary, North Carolina. The founder of the town of Cary, Allison Francis Page, built the Second Empire style hotel about 1868, and  J. R. Walker bought it later. Page's son Walter Hines Page (1855–1918) was an American journalist, publisher, and diplomat.

History
From 1868 until 1916, passengers from the Southern and Seaboard Air Line railroads stayed at the Page-Walker Hotel. The building served as a boarding house and private residence from 1916 until 1980. After the business closed, the building sat vacant and deteriorated for five years until the Cary Town Council purchased the property. Volunteers restored the exterior of the hotel to its original design.

Museum
The Arts & History Center also contains the Cary Heritage Museum, gallery exhibitions, educational rooms, an archive gallery, a smokehouse, and a garden. The Page-Walker Hotel was added to the National Register of Historic Places on May 29, 1979.

Events Today
The Page-Walker currently hosts a variety of events such as weddings. Annually, they host a "Paint the Page" art contest in which young artists from grades 8-12 are invited to draw an aspect of the building that inspires them most.

See also
 List of museums in North Carolina
 National Register of Historic Places listings in Wake County, North Carolina

References

External links
 Town of Cary: Page-Walker Arts & History Center website
 Friends of the Page-Walker Hotel website

Houses completed in 1868
Historic house museums in North Carolina
Museums in Wake County, North Carolina
Art museums and galleries in North Carolina
History museums in North Carolina
Buildings and structures in Cary, North Carolina
Hotels in North Carolina
Hotels established in 1868
Houses in Wake County, North Carolina
Houses on the National Register of Historic Places in North Carolina
Hotel buildings on the National Register of Historic Places in North Carolina
National Register of Historic Places in Wake County, North Carolina
Second Empire architecture in North Carolina